A sundial is a device that indicates time by using a light spot or shadow cast by the position of the Sun on a reference scale. As the Earth turns on its polar axis, the sun appears to cross the sky from east to west, rising at sun-rise from beneath the horizon to a zenith at mid-day and falling again behind the horizon at sunset. Both the azimuth (direction) and the altitude (height) can be used to create time measuring devices. Sundials have been invented independently in every major culture and became more accurate and sophisticated as the culture developed.

Introduction
A sundial uses local time. Before the coming of the railways in the 1840s, local time was displayed on a sundial and was used by the government and commerce. Before the invention of the clock the sundial was the only source of time. After the invention of the clock, the sundial maintained its importance, as clocks needed to be reset regularly from a sundial, because the accuracy of early clocks was poor. A clock and a sundial were used together to measure longitude. Dials were laid out using straight edges and compasses. In the late nineteenth century sundials became objects of academic interest. The use of logarithms allowed algebraic methods of laying out dials to be employed and studied. No longer utilitarian, sundials remained as popular ornaments, and several popular books promoted that interest- and gave constructional details. Affordable scientific calculators made the algebraic methods as accessible as the geometric constructions- and the use of computers made dial plate design trivial. The heritage of sundials was recognised and sundial societies were set up worldwide, and certain legislations made studying sundials part of their national school curriculums.

History

Ancient sundials

The earliest household clocks known, from the archaeological finds, are the sundials (1500 BC) in Ancient Egypt and ancient Babylonian astronomy. Ancient analemmatic sundials of the same era (about 1500  BC) and their prototype have been discovered on the territory of modern Russia. Much earlier obelisks, once thought to have been used also as sundials, placed at temples built in honor of a pharaoh, are now thought to serve only as a memorial. Presumably, humans were telling time from shadow-lengths at an even earlier date, but this is hard to verify. Sundials were also developed in Kush. Sundials existed in China since ancient times, but very little is known of their history. It is known that the ancient Chinese developed a form of sundials c. 800 BCE, and the sundials eventually evolved to very sophisticated water clocks by 1000 AD, and sometime in the Song Dynasty (1000-1400 AD), a compass would sometimes also be constructed on the sundial.
There is an early reference to sundials from 104 BC in an assembly of calendar experts.

The ancient Greeks developed many of the principles and forms of the sundial. Sundials are believed to have been introduced into Greece by Anaximander of Miletus, . According to Herodotus, Greek sundials were initially derived from their Babylonian counterparts. The Greeks were well-positioned to develop the science of sundials, having developed the science of geometry, and in particular discovering the conic sections that are traced by a sundial nodus. The mathematician and astronomer Theodosius of Bithynia ( to ) is said to have invented a universal sundial that could be used anywhere on Earth.

The Romans adopted the Greek sundials, and the first record of a sundial in Rome is 293 BC according to Pliny. A comic character in a play by Plautus complained about his day being "chopped into pieces" by the ubiquitous sundials. All of these are believed to be nodus-type sundials, differing mainly in the surface that receives the shadow of the nodus.

 the hemicyclium of Berosus the Chaldean: a truncated, concave, hemispherical surface
 the hemispherium or scaphe of Aristarchus of Samos: a full, concave, hemispherical surface
 the discus (a disc on a plane surface) of Aristarchus of Samos: a fully circular equatorial dial with nodus
 the arachne (spiderweb) of Eudoxus of Cnidus or Apollonius of Perga: half a circular equatorial dial with nodus
 the plinthium or lacunar of Scopinas of Syracuse: an example in the Circus Flaminius)
 the pros ta historoumena (universal dial) of Parmenio
 the pros pan klima of Theodosius of Bithynia and Andreas
 the pelekinon of Patrocles: the classic double-bladed axe design of hyperbolae on a planar surface
 the cone of Dionysodorus: a concave, conical surface
 the quiver of Apollonius of Perga
 the conarachne
 the conical plinthium
 the antiboreum: a hemispherium that faces North, with the sunlight entering through a small hole.

The Globe of Matelica is felt to have been part of an Ancient Roman sundial from the first or second century.

The custom of measuring time by one's shadow has persisted since ancient times. In Aristophanes' play, Assembly of Women, Praxagora asks her husband to return when his shadow reaches . The Venerable Bede is reported to have instructed his followers in the art of telling time by interpreting their shadow lengths. However, Bede's important association with sundials is that he encouraged the use of canonical sundials to fix the times of prayers.

Medieval sundials
In the mediaeval Islamic world timekeeping technology advanced, both because of the Islamic Golden Age and because timekeeping was important for determining when to pray. Their improvements included using algebra and trigonometry (the former being invented by Persian mathematician al-Khwarizmi) to increase accuracy.

Advanced technology and knowledge was brought back to Europe from the Islamic world during the Crusades This included advanced knowledge of sundials, including the 13th century writings of Abu Ali al-Hasan al-Marrakushi regarding the use of specially curved sundials to produce equally sized units of time. Before that advancement, the length of units of time varied according to the time of year, a "solar hour" being anywhere from 40 to 80 minutes depending on whether it was summer or winter.

Europe then saw an explosion of new designs. Italian astronomer Giovanni Padovani published a treatise on the sundial in 1570, in which he included instructions for the manufacture and laying out of mural (vertical) and horizontal sundials.  Giuseppe Biancani's Constructio instrumenti ad horologia solaria (ca. 1620) discusses how to make a perfect sundial, with accompanying illustrations.

The dials of Giovanni Francesco Zarbula 
Painted vertical declining dials in villages around Briançon, Hautes-Alpes, France. There are 400 painted dials in this one French department dating form the 18th and 19th centuries. The most famous sundial maker was Giovanni Francesco Zarbula (fr) who created a hundred of them between 1833 and 1881.

Modern dialing
The Greek dials were inherited and developed further by the Islamic Caliphate cultures and the post-Renaissance Europeans.  Since the Greek dials were nodus-based with straight hour-lines, they indicated unequal hours—also called temporary hours—that varied with the seasons, since every day was divided into twelve equal segments; thus, hours were shorter in winter and longer in summer.  The idea of using hours of equal time length throughout the year was the innovation of Abu'l-Hasan Ibn al-Shatir in 1371, based on earlier developments in trigonometry by Muhammad ibn Jābir al-Harrānī al-Battānī (Albategni). Ibn al-Shatir was aware that "using a gnomon that is parallel to the Earth's axis will produce sundials whose hour lines indicate equal hours on any day of the year." His sundial is the oldest polar-axis sundial still in existence, and a replica can still be seen on Madhanat ul-'Urus, one of the minarets of Umayyad Mosque. The concept later appeared in Western sundials from at least 1446.

The oldest sundial in England is a tide dial incorporated into the Bewcastle Cross, Cumbria, and dates from the 7th or early 8th century.

Twentieth and twenty-first century dialing
Designers of the Taipei 101, the first record-setting skyscraper of the 21st century, brought the ancient tradition forward. The tower, tallest in the world when it opened in Taiwan in 2004, stands over half a kilometer in height. The design of an adjoining park uses the tower as the style for a huge horizontal sundial.

Gallery

Modern

See also
Foucault pendulum
Francesco Bianchini
Horology
Scottish sundial — the ancient renaissance sundials of Scotland.
Tide dial — early sundials which show the canonical hours ("tides") of the day
Wilanów Palace Sundial, created by Johannes Hevelius in about 1684.

References
Notes

Bibliography

  Reprint of the 1902 book published by Macmillan (New York).
 A.P.Herbert, Sundials Old and New, Methuen & Co. Ltd, 1967.
 
 Hugo Michnik, Theorie einer Bifilar-Sonnenuhr, Astronomishe Nachrichten, 217(5190), p. 81-90, 1923
  Slightly amended reprint of the 1970 translation published by University of Toronto Press (Toronto).  The original was published in 1965 under the title Les Cadrans solaires by Gauthier-Villars (Montrouge, France).
  Frederick W. Sawyer, Bifilar gnomonics, JBAA (Journal of the British Astronomical association), 88(4):334–351, 1978
Gerard L'E. Turner, Antique Scientific Instruments, Blandford Press Ltd. 1980 
J.L. Heilbron, The sun in the church: cathedrals as solar observatories, Harvard University Press, 2001  .
 Make A Sundial, (The Education Group British Sundial Society) Editors Jane Walker and David Brown, British Sundial Society 1991 
 
"Illustrating Shadows", Simon Wheaton-Smith, LCN: 2005900674

External links

 British Sundial Society- Time line and register
 The Ancient Vedic Sun Dial

Sundials